The Pearl Button is a 2015 Chilean documentary film directed by Patricio Guzmán. It was screened in the main competition section of the 65th Berlin International Film Festival where it won the Silver Bear for Best Script. It won the Lumières Award for Best Documentary at the 21st Lumières Awards. The filmmaker has described the work as part of a triptych with Nostalgia for the Light and potentially a third film focusing on the Andes.

It explores familiar Guzmán themes such as memory and the historical past, particularly that of history's losers rather than victors, recording some of the last surviving members of the original Alacalufe and Yaghan tribes. A departure for Guzmán is that it does not focus solely on Chile's past under Augusto Pinochet, as the title was partly inspired by a shirt button discovered during a 2004 investigation by Chilean judge Juan Guzmán on a length of rail used to weigh the bodies of Pinochet's victims dumped in the sea and partly by the button after which the Yaghan native Jemmy Button was named when taken aboard  in 1830.

Summary
The film is a contemplative exploration of the geography and history of Chile, with a focus on water, which permeates the country and sustains its people. The narrative examines the fate of two persecuted groups - the indigenous peoples and the victims of Pinochet. The topics covered include the far north of Chile, which is the driest place on earth, where radio telescopes in the desert reveal new insights about the cosmos every day. The film also touches on personal experiences, such as a school friend lost to the sea.

The narrative delves into the genocide of the native tribes in the far south and how their way of life was destroyed. It also shares the story of Jemmy Button, who was taken from Tierra del Fuego to England. The film touches on the efforts made under Allende to rehabilitate the surviving tribespeople and the concentration camps established under Pinochet. It depicts how inmates were tortured and their bodies, weighted with lengths of rail, were dropped from helicopters into the Pacific. The film reveals how one corpse was washed ashore, and how one of the lengths of rail recovered from the sea had a mother-of-pearl shirt button encrusted to it. Overall, the film provides a powerful meditation on the impact of historical events on individuals and communities.

References

External links
 

2015 films
2015 documentary films
Chilean documentary films
2010s Spanish-language films
Films directed by Patricio Guzmán
Documentary films about historical events
History of Magallanes Region
Genocide of indigenous peoples of South America
Yaghan
Documentary films about indigenous rights
Documentary films about Latin America
Kawésqar